The Ringing Ball is a 2009 Turkish comedy film written and directed by Mahir Egemen Ertürk, about a team of blind football players who want to attend the 2004 Summer Paralympics in Athens.

Production
The film was shot on location in Istanbul, Turkey.

Plot
The film follows a handful of blind people, including a fisherman, a call-center agent and a man who sells lottery tickets on the street, from the Bosporus Society for the Blind, training to compete in the soccer category at the Paralympics. Kerem (Burak Önal), a former soccer star who has become an alcoholic coaches the team and falls in love with the beautiful Semra (İpek Özkök), a young woman works for the society. Unfortunately, Kerem has some thugs on his tail due to his past debts and his weakness for wine puts his coaching activities in danger.

Release

General release 

Festival screenings 
 21st Ankara International Film Festival
 50th Selanik International Film Festival

Reception

Box Office
The film has made a total gross of $67,352.

Reviews
Emine Yıldrım, writing in Today's Zaman, describes the film as, "a borderline emotion exploiter that performs quite pleasantly despite some of its excesses until that point at the very end in which the filmmakers transform their cute story into a slice of unnecessary arabesque." "The film", he continues, "has a lot of funny and sweet moments thanks to the enthusiasm of the actors who are playing the blind team members, and director Ertürk should be congratulated for portraying them with respect instead of pity", and, "I was smiling with amusement as I was watching this quasi-sports comedy until I was subjected to the bombardment of sentiment in the movie's final 10 minutes, thus I regret to say that I couldn't help ending up cowered with a sour expression on my face. They had taken away my feel-good moment, and I don't even know for what purpose." He concludes that the film, "has the potential to reach the hearts of enough audience members; it tries to illustrate a positive message - anyone can do anything. It's just that no one wants to watch an alcoholic overcome with self-pity if they're in the mood for regaining hope."

See also 
 2009 in film
 Turkish films of 2009

References

External links
 
 

2009 films
Turkish comedy films
2009 comedy films
Films set in Turkey